Johannes Megapolensis (1603–1670) was a dominie (pastor) of the Dutch Reformed Church in the Dutch colony of New Netherland (present-day New York state in the United States), beginning in 1642. Serving for several years at Fort Orange (present-day Albany, New York) on the upper Hudson River, he is credited with being the first Protestant missionary to the Indians in North America. He later served as a minister in Manhattan, staying through the takeover by the English in 1664.

The minister is best known as the author of A Short Account of the Mohawk Indians, their Country, Language, Figure, Costume, Religion, and Government, first published from his letters by friends in 1644 in North Holland, and being translated into English in 1792 and printed in Philadelphia. He is also known for having assisted the French missionary, Father Isaac Jogues in the 1643. The priest had been serving as a missionary to the Hurons and had been taken captive by the Mohawk. After his tenure in Rensselaerwyck, Megapolensis went to New Amsterdam intending to return to Holland. Governor Peter Stuyvesant prevailed upon him to remain and undertake the duties of pastor. In 1664, he was instrumental in facilitating a smooth transition to British rule.

Biography

Early life
Megapolensis was born in Koendyck (Koedijk), Netherlands in 1603. His father, also named Johannes, was a Protestant dominie or minister in Egmont-aan-Zee. The father Latinized the family name from the original van Mecelenburg. (Another source suggests the original name was von Grootstede.) However, from his translations of the Van Rensselaer Bowier Manuscripts, A.J.F. van Laer suggests that Magapolensis was not the son, but the nephew of Johannes, Sr. and married the daughter of the latter's wife by her first marriage. He became a Protestant clergyman after abandoning Catholicism in his youth. In 1634 he was pastor in Wieringerwaard. Four years later he was minister at Schoorl.

In 1630 the younger Megapolensis married Mathilde Willems in the Netherlands.  The couple had at least four children born there in the next twelve years. Their son Johannes became a surgeon working at Fort Orange. In 1654, their daughter Hillegond married Cornelis van Ruyven, secretary to the colonial Council.

Rensselaerwyck
In 1642 Megapolensis was hired by Kiliaen van Rensselaer, the Patroon of Rensselaerwyck, a vast estate encompassing much of what is now Albany and Rensselaer counties, to serve as minister to his territory. The contract was for six years. A disagreement arose between Van Rensselaer and the Directors of the Dutch West India Company, the Directors maintaining that they alone had the authority to commission clergy for the colony. As the ship was about to sail, the parties resolved their differences, neither side conceding their prerogatives. When it became known that Van Rensselaer planned to erect a church upriver at Rensselaerswyck, Governor Kieft hastened his plans to rebuild the church in Fort Amsterdam.

Megapolensis and his family went to New Netherland, where he served in Rensselaerswyck and later Fort Orange until 1649. At first the family lived in Greenbush, New York before moving to Fort Orange (now the city of Albany). Van Rensselaer made it clear that in the event of disagreements between the chief administrator, Arent van Curler and the chief legal officer Adriaen van der Donck, Megapolensis should try to arbitrate the dispute, but that ultimately the decision would lie with the older, mature clergyman pending any appeal to the patroon.

During this period, Megapolensis served as missionary to the Mohawk people, and is believed to be the first Protestant missionary to Native Americans in North America. The Mohawk territory was west of Fort Orange in the Mohawk River valley but extending up to the St. Lawrence River and down to the Delaware River, with other territories used for hunting. During the summer trading season, Mohawks frequently spent the night in Dutch houses, including the dominie's.

He became fluent in the Mohawk language and recorded many details about the Mohawk people and their culture. From his letters home, his friends in the Netherlands compiled A Short Account of the Mohawk Indians, their Country, Language, Figure, Costume, Religion, and Government, publishing it in North Holland in 1644. This was apparently done without his knowledge or permission. The account was reprinted by Joost Hartgers in 1651 in the Netherlands. The first English translation by Ebenezer Hazard was printed by him in 1792 in Philadelphia, with a revised translation by Brodhead in 1857. Another version translated by A. Clinton Crowell of Brown University was printed in 1909 by Jameson in the United States.

In his letters, Megapolensis had compared the land of Rensselaerwyck to that of Germany and described the rich abundance of game, birds and other wildlife. Megapolensis described Mohawk dress, marriage customs and culture. He characterized the Mohawk ritual torture of captives as cruel, but noted that they seldom killed people in their culture, despite their lack of laws and authorities as he understood them. He contrasted that with the much higher rate of murders in his home country of the Netherlands.

The minister was known for assisting French Catholic missionary Isaac Jogues escape captivity, when he was being held by the Mohawk. They were hostile to Jogues because of earlier French attacks against Mohawk villages. In the autumn of 1642, Jogues was captured by the Mohawk and brought to their village of Ossernenon. Hearing of this, Arent van Curler, commissary of Rensselaerwyck, visited the "first castle" of the Mohawks and attempted to ransom Jogues, but without success as the Mohawk were not inclined to release him at that time. About a year later, the Mohawk were persuaded to bring the priest with them when they came to Beverwijck to trade. Once there, Van Curler helped Jogues to escape. The dominie helped conceal the priest until a deal could be reached and the Frenchman put on a ship to take him downriver. Pastor Megapolensis befriended Jogues and accompanied him to New Amsterdam, where Jogues stayed with the pastor while waiting for a ship to take him to France. The following year François-Joseph Bressani was also ransomed.

New Amsterdam
At the conclusion of his term of ministry, Megapolensis planned to return to Holland, but was asked by Pieter Stuyvesant to become chief minister of the Dutch church in New Amsterdam. The dominie was initially reluctant and had to be persuaded with "friendly force". By the time he decided to stay, his wife had sailed and she returned to New Amsterdam in 1650. As dominie in New Amsterdam, Megapolensis was also responsible for mission stations in Bergen, New Jersey, the village of Haarlem, and occasionally in Brooklyn. In 1652, the Amsterdam classis sent Samuel Drisius, then serving in London, to assist Megapolensis. In 1656 Megapolensis purchased land in the city from Abraham Isaacsen Verplanck. That same year Lutherans in New Netherland petitioned for permission for public worship. This was opposed both by the authorities in the colony as well as in Amsterdam as it was viewed as reducing the Reformed congregation. The Lutherans wrote the Lutheran consistory in Amsterdam to send a good, God-fearing preacher, "...since among the Reformed here there is one who formerly was a Jesuit and on that account is very politic and disputatious." By this they meant Dominie Megapolensis. They also charged that the baptismal liturgy used was too similar to "the Papal church".

On March 18, 1655, he sent a letter to the Classis at Amsterdam, noting, “Last summer some Jews came here from Holland in order to trade... they came several times to my house, weeping and bemoaning their misery. If I directed them to the Jewish merchants, they said they would not even lend them a few stivers”. Megapolensis further argued that the followers of the “unrighteous Mammon” aimed to get possession of Christian property and to outdo other merchants by drawing all trade toward themselves. These “godless rascals, who are of no benefit to the country, but look at everything for their own profit, may be sent away from here.”

During 1657-1658 French Jesuit Simon Le Moyne journeyed from Ossernenon to Fort Orange and then to New Amsterdam to attend to the few Catholics residing there as well as some French sailors who had recently arrived in port with a prize ship. While there, he paid a call on Megapolensis to thank him for his kindness to Jogues.

In 1664 he and his son Samuel, a physician as well as minister, were among the advisers counseling Stuyvesant, the governor of the city, to surrender New Amsterdam to the English, who had taken control of other Dutch territory At one point, they drew him away as Stuyvesant was about to order a barrage on English frigates off the fort. The West India Company would later blame the capitulation on councilors and clergymen, "...desirous of saving their houses which were next to the fort." Susanah Shaw Romney says that his daughter Hillegond van Ruyven and Lydia de Meyer crossed enemy lines to Long Island to conduct back-door negotiations with the English. Shortly after their return, "...a council of residents and colonial leaders presented Stuyvesant with English terms, and he finally empowered a group of Amsterdammers to negotiate the peaceful handover."

Staying in New York, as it was renamed by the English, the minister helped establish the rights of the Reformed Church under English rule. His role in the surrender may have had repercussions, as on two separate occasions years later, prominent Dutch citizens testified under oath to his loyalty to the West India Company. Some accounts say that Megapolensis returned to Holland a few years later in 1668, where he died. According to Thomas DeWitt, it was his son Samuel, associate pastor at New Amsterdam, who returned to Holland. Others say that Johannes remained in New York, dying there in 1669 or 1670.

Writing
Johann Megapolensis, Jr. "A Short Account of the Mohawk Indians," 1644, in Dean R. Snow, Charles T. Gehring, William A. Starna, ed., In Mohawk Country: Early Narratives about a Native People], Syracuse University Press, 1996

Notes

References

External links
 Johann Megapolensis, Jr. "A Short Account of the Mohawk Indians," 1644, in Dean R. Snow, Charles T. Gehring, William A. Starna, ed., In Mohawk Country: Early Narratives about a Native People], Syracuse University Press, 1996, 405 pages

1670 deaths
1608 births
Reformed Church in America ministers
17th-century Dutch Calvinist and Reformed ministers
People of New Netherland
Protestant missionaries in the United States
Dutch members of the Dutch Reformed Church
Dutch Reformed Church missionaries
Dutch Protestant missionaries